Josh Branscum (born June 13, 1982) is an American politician serving as a member of the Kentucky House of Representatives from the 83rd district. Elected in November 2020, he assumed office on January 1, 2021.

Early life and education 
Branscum was born and raised in Russell Springs, Kentucky. He earned a Bachelor of Arts degree in organizational communication from Georgetown College and a Bachelor of Science in construction management from Eastern Kentucky University.

Career 
Branscum is the president of Branscum Construction. He was elected to the Kentucky House of Representatives in November 2020 and assumed office on January 1, 2021. In February 2021, Branscum became the lead sponsor of an election security bill.

Committee Assignments 

 Transportation
 Elections, Const. Amendments & Intergovernmental Affairs
 Appropriations & Revenue
 Economic Development & Workforce Investment

References 

1982 births
Living people
People from Russell County, Kentucky
Eastern Kentucky University alumni
Republican Party members of the Kentucky House of Representatives